Lepthoplosternum ucamara is a species of catfish of the family Callichthyidae.  This species is known from the Pacaya-Samiria National Reserve in the lower Ucayali River in Peru and from the area of confluence of the Solimões River and Japurá River in Brazil.

References
 

Callichthyidae
Fish of South America
Fish of Brazil
Fish of Peru
Taxa named by Roberto Esser dos Reis
Fish described in 2005